Scarpe Mountain is located on the border of Alberta and British Columbia on the Continental Divide. It was named after the Scarpe River in France.

See also
 List of peaks on the Alberta–British Columbia border
 Mountains of Alberta
 Mountains of British Columbia

References

Scarpe Mountain
Scarpe Mountain
Canadian Rockies